This is a list of museums with major art collections from the Ancient Near East.

 British Museum, London, UK. 290,000 objects.
 Vorderasiatisches Museum, Berlin, Germany. 250,000 objects.
 National Museum of Iraq, Baghdad, Iraq. 170,000 objects.
 Musée du Louvre, Paris, France. 100,000 objects.
 Mosul Museum, Iraq. 
 Sulaymaniyah Museum, Iraq
 Basra Museum, Iraq
 Oriental Institute, Chicago. 20,000 objects
 Metropolitan Museum of Art, New York. 7,000 objects
 Istanbul Archaeology Museum, Istanbul, Turkey.
 University of Pennsylvania Museum of Archaeology and Anthropology, Pennsylvania.
 Rijksmuseum van Oudheden, Leiden, The Netherlands.
 Israel Museum, Jerusalem, Israel.
 Eretz Israel Museum, Tel Aviv, Israel.
 Hecht Museum, Haifa, Israel.
 Bible Lands Museum, Jerusalem, Israel.
 Semitic Museum, Cambridge, Massachusetts.
 Musei reali, Turin, Italy
 Vatican Museums, Rome, Italy

References

Ancient Near East Art

Ancient Near East art and architecture